"Out of Control (Back for More)" is a song by Finnish DJ and record producer Darude. The song is a vocal edit of "Out of Control", an instrumental from his debut studio album Before the Storm. The edit was released on many re-releases of Before the Storm, and was included as the opening track on the 2001 special edition.

The song failed to reach number one in Finland, unlike his previous single "Feel the Beat", however it saw success regardless and charted internationally, reaching number 13 in on the UK Singles Chart.

Music video
A music video was filmed for "Out of Control (Back for More)". The video was produced by Filmitalli and directed by Misko Iho. It was filmed in Helsinki at Yrjönkadun Uimahalli. The video features female swimmers in a swimming pool, and also features Darude sitting in a chair under the water. The video ends with a reversed shot of Darude rising out of the pool.

Track listings

Charts

References

2001 singles
Darude songs
2000 songs